Waterfield is an English surname. Notable people with the surname include:

Characters 
 Victoria Waterfield, companion of the Second Doctor in British TV series Doctor Who

People
 Bob Waterfield (1920–1983), American football player
 George Waterfield (1901–1988), English association footballer
 Giles Waterfield (1949–2016), British novelist, art historian and curator
 Harry Lee Waterfield (1911–1988), Lieutenant Governor of Kentucky
 Sir Henry Waterfield (1837–1913), British civil servant
 Peter Waterfield (born 1981), British diver
 Reginald Waterfield (1867–1967), Anglican priest
 Reginald Lawson Waterfield (1900–1986), British haematologist
 Richard A. Waterfield (1939–2007), member of the Texas House of Representatives
 Robin Waterfield (born 1952), British classical scholar

See also
 R v Waterfield, a leading English case on common law police powers

English-language surnames